Robert Paul Brunet (born July 29, 1946) is a former American football running back in the National Football League for the Washington Redskins.  He played college football at Louisiana Tech University and was drafted in the seventh round of the 1968 NFL Draft.

In 1973, Robert and his brother Billy started a seafood delivery business, and the next year, the family opened a Cajun Seafood Market.

In 1977, the Brunets opened a restaurant called “The Galley,” changing its name in the early 1980s to "Brunet’s Cajun Restaurant." Brunet’s was known for its seafood dishes — made from family recipes — and could seat more than 300 people.  The restaurant was open for 34 years, and the brothers retired in 2011.

References 

1946 births
Living people
People from Lafourche Parish, Louisiana
Players of American football from Louisiana
American football running backs
Louisiana Tech Bulldogs football players
Washington Redskins players